This is a list of Danish punk rock bands from Denmark.

A

B

E
Electric Deads

H
Hjertestop
Horrorpops

I
Iceage

L

S
Sods

W